Biesenthal is a town in the district of Barnim in Brandenburg, Germany. It is the administrative seat of the Amt ("collective municipality") Amt Biesenthal-Barnim.

Geography

The surrounding Biesenthal Basin is part of the Barnim Plateau and the Barnim Nature Park, characterised by numerous kames and glacial lakes stemming from the Weichselian glaciation.

History
In the early Middle Ages, the region was settled by Polabian Slavs. Conquered by the Ascanian margraves of Brandenburg, Bizdal was first mentioned in a 1258 deed. A local parish was already documented in 1265; the present-day fieldstone church was probably erected at this time. The settlement on the Via Imperii trade route to Berlin was vested with market rights by Margrave John V in 1315.

A castle was mentioned in 1337, it was purchased by the Hohenzollern elector John George of Brandenburg in 1577. Its ruins were cleared away after the Thirty Years' War, only ground walls remained. In 1907, a view tower (Kaiser-Friedrich-Turm) was erected on the castle hill.

During the 18th century, the townscape was devastated by several blazes. The economic development was decisively promoted by the opening of the Berlin–Stettin railway line in 1843. In World War II, a subcamp of the Sachsenhausen concentration camp was located here. The town was occupied by Red Army forces in 1945 and became part of the Soviet occupation zone.

Demography

Politics

Seats in the town's assembly (Stadtverordnetenversammlung) as of 2014 local elections:
The Left: 6
Christian Democratic Union of Germany (CDU): 4
Bürger für Biesenthal (independent): 3
Alliance '90/The Greens: 2
Social Democratic Party of Germany (SPD): 2
Pro Danewitz (independent): 1

Notable people
Jürgen Paeke (born 1948), gymnast
 Max Schmeling (1905-2005), world boxing champion, frequent guest at the training camp in Biesenthal 
 Heinz Graffunder (1926-1994), city architect in Berlin; lived in Biesenthal
 Joachim Ziesche (born 1939), ice hockey player, lives in Biesenthal

References

External links

Municipal site 

Localities in Barnim